National Independence Party of Afghanistan is a political party in Afghanistan, led by Taj Muhammad Wardak.

References

Political parties in Afghanistan